You Must Be Joking Too! is a 1987 South African comedy film directed by Leon Schuster and produced by Elmo de Witt. The film's music was composed by Johan van Rensburg.

Release
Released in 1987, this English language film. was Schuster's script writing and directoral debut.

Cast
 Leon Schuster
 Eddie Eckstein
 Pierre Knoesen
 Cobus Rossouw
 Ian Roberts
 Hennie Smit
 Koos Strauss
 Claudia Turgas

References

External links
 

1987 films
1987 comedy films
Films set in South Africa
South African comedy films
Afrikaans-language films
English-language South African films